H.B. Plant High School is a public high school located in the neighborhood of South Tampa in Tampa, Florida, United States. It opened in 1927 between South Himes Avenue on the east and Dale Mabry Highway on the west. The school is named in honor of railroad and hotel tycoon Henry B. Plant, who connected Tampa to the United States railroad system in 1884, helping the isolated village to grow into a large city over the following decades. The school mascot is the Panther, and its motto is "Strength Through Unity."  Plant High School has an enrollment of more than 2,500 students.

Academics
U.S. News & World Report ranked Plant High the 17th best public school in Florida and 263rd nationally in 2015.  The school has twice been named a Blue Ribbon School of Excellence (1990 and 1997).

Music

The high school music program consists of musical theater, an orchestra, five chorale groups, two a cappella groups and a marching band, a wind ensemble, a symphonic band and a jazz band.  The Marching Panther Band is a combination of all these groups and performs at all football games and various community events.

Athletics

Interscholastic sports at Plant are sanctioned by the FHSAA.  The following sports are available. Those marked with an asterisk (*) are non-sanctioned club sports.

Baseball
Basketball (boys' and girls') Girls 2021 state champion
Cheerleading: 2021 FHSAA Regional Runner Up, 2021 FHSAA third in the State Championship (Medium 2A Division), 
Crew*
Cross country
Girls state championships in 1991, 1992, 1993, 1994, 1995, 1997, 2001, 2002, 2010, 2011, 2018, and 2020
Flag football
Football
State Champions - 2006, 2008, 2009, 2010 and 2011
Golf - State Champions - 2016
Hockey*
Lacrosse
Sailing*
Soccer
Softball
Swimming and diving
Tennis - Girls Tennis - 2012, 2013 State Champions
Track
Volleyball
State Champions - 1975, 1976, 2006-2010 and 2021 
Wrestling

JROTC / AFJROTC

Overview 

The Plant high school AFJROTC (FL-20056) founded in 2005 is a 4-year; 2 semester Junior Reserve Officer Training Corps Program sponsored by the U.S. Airforce. The program's main goal is to create better citizens of character in their community AFJROTC includes an aerospace science, leadership education, physical fitness, and life skills curriculum. They do things such as Community Service as well as School Beatification in order to maintain a healthy running Junior ROTC program.

AFJROTC is not a military recruiting program.  Students enrolled in AFJROTC are not under any

obligation to join the military.  AFJROTC emphasizes citizenship and offers opportunities for leadership

responsibility roles.  The citizenship charter is stated in Title 10 United States Code law.

AFJROTC is not a typical high school class elective.  It is a program where student cadets are expected

to participate in out of class activities such as competition and performance teams, community service,

and fund raising to offset AFJROTC program costs for out of class activities.

Leadership 
The Current H.B. Plant High School AFJROTC Program is led by Senior Aero-Space Instructor (SASI),  USAF Major (RET.), Carlson, and Aero-Space Instructor (ASI), USAF Master Sergeant  (RET.), Conteh.

Schedule 
Monday: Uniform Wear (Dress Blues)

Monday - Wednesday: Academics

Thursday: Physical Training

Friday: Drill

Extra-Curriculars 
The program provides extra courses such as:- Air Force Drill Team      - Flag Detail Color Guard

- Marksmanship team     - Saber Color Guard

- JLAB                                   - Physical Training Team

- Push Up Squad               - Orienteering Team

- RPA Team                        - Kitty Hawk national honor society

Notable alumni
 
 Andrew Beck, NFL player for the Denver Broncos
 Pete Alonso, MLB player for the New York Mets
 Trey Azagthoth, founder and lead guitarist for Morbid Angel
 Wade Boggs, Hall of Fame baseball player
 John R. Culbreath, politician
 Sandra Freedman, 55th Mayor of Tampa, Florida
 Gallagher, comedian
 Sam Gibbons, US congressman 
 Mychal Givens, MLB player for the Baltimore Orioles
 Ruth Hall, actress
 Richard King, four-time Academy Award winner for Best Sound Editing
 Lane Lindell, represented America in Miss World 2008
 Bobby Lord, country musician
 Robert Marve, former CFL quarterback for the Winnipeg Blue Bombers
 Aaron Murray, NFL quarterback
 Stephen Stills, member of Crosby, Stills, Nash and Young musical group
 Kyle Tucker, baseball player for the Houston Astros
 Preston Tucker, former MLB player, currently playing in Korea
 Dreama Walker, actress known for her role in Gossip Girl
 Mazzi Wilkins, NFL player for the Baltimore Ravens
 Mike Williams, former NFL wide receiver
 James Wilder, Jr., NFL and CFL running back for the Toronto Argonauts
 Eric Patterson, NFL cornerback
 Orson Charles, NFL tight end for the Cleveland Browns
 Lyrics Born, rapper and producer
 Christian Watson, NFL wide receiver for the Green Bay Packers

References

External links

 Henry B. Plant High School
 School District of Hillsborough County

Educational institutions established in 1926
High schools in Tampa, Florida
Public high schools in Florida
1926 establishments in Florida